Juan Torralbo-Olmo is a Spanish former professional tennis player.

Torralbo, the 1977 King's Cup champion, made the second round twice at the Torneo Godó, including in 1980 when he was beaten by Ivan Lendl. He had a career high singles ranking of 264 in the world.

References

External links
 
 

Year of birth missing (living people)
Living people
Spanish male tennis players